The fourth courtyard is one of four at Prague Castle, in Prague, Czech Republic.

External links
 

Prague Castle
Courtyards